Lysolaje is a cadastral district of Prague, located in the north-east of the city, with a population of 1,484 (2021). Lysolaje borders the cadastral areas of Suchdol to the north, Sedlec to the east and Dejvice to the south, and the village of Horoměřice to the west.

History

The area of Lysolaje has been settled since prehistoric times, and the modern settlement dates to at least the 13th century, when it was a farming village. Ottokar I dedicated the lands to the St. Wenceslas Chapel at Prague Castle. From the 16th century, the village was also used for wine-making. The last landowner of the village before it became self-governing in the 19th century was the Supreme Burgrave of the Kingdom of Bohemia.

Lysolaje became part of Prague in 1968, and became a cadastral district on 24 November 1990. Today it forms part of a wildlife corridor on the edge of the city.

Notable people 
 Eliška Krásnohorská, lived here from 1862–1867.

References

External links 
 Official website
 

Districts of Prague